"How Do You Do" released in 1971 was an international hit single for Dutch duo Mouth & MacNeal. It was #1 in the Netherlands, Belgium, Denmark, Switzerland, and New Zealand. It also spent 19 weeks in the Billboard Hot 100 a year later, reaching #8 and a cover version by Scots-German duo Die Windows (later Windows) reached #1 in Germany. The single earned Mouth & MacNeal, and its composers Hans van Hemert and Harry van Hoof, the 1972 Buma Export Award for the most records sold abroad by a Dutch musical act in that year.

In Australia, two versions reached the Top 40 simultaneously, the bigger hit being by Jigsaw.

Charts and certifications

Weekly charts

Year-end charts

Certifications

See also
Billboard Year-End Hot 100 singles of 1972
Dutch Top 40 number-one hits of 1971
Dutch Top 40 number-one hits of 1972
List of number-one hits of 1972 (Switzerland)
List of number-one singles in 1972 (New Zealand)

References

External links

1971 singles
1972 singles
Dutch Top 40 number-one singles
Number-one singles in Belgium
Number-one singles in Denmark
Number-one singles in New Zealand
Number-one singles in Switzerland
Songs written by Hans van Hemert
Mouth & MacNeal songs